The Society for Collegiate Journalists (SCJ) is an American honor society for student journalists.

It was formed on June 1, 1975 as a merger between the two journalism honor societies Pi Delta Epsilon (ΠΔΕ) and Alpha Phi Gamma (ΑΦΓ).

Many of its activities take place at the chapter level. At the national level, the SCJ runs a biennial national convention and publishes an online journal, The Collegiate Journalist, and a newsletter, The Reporter.

Chapters of Pi Delta Epsilon
These are some of the chapters of Pi Delta Epsilon, founded in 1909 at Syracuse University and existent in 1922; there may be others.

Alpha Division 
 Alpha Alpha chapter - 1909, Syracuse University
 Alpha Gamma chapter - 1910, Massachusetts Institute of Technology
 Alpha Delta chapter - 19xx, Ohio Wesleyan University
 Alpha Epsilon chapter - 1915, Columbia University
 Alpha Iota chapter - 19xx, Colgate University
 Alpha Kappa chapter - 19xx, University of Michigan
 Alpha Omicron chapter - 19xx, University of Illinois
 Alpha Nu chapter - 19xx, Dartmouth College
 Alpha Pi chapter - 19xx, University of Toronto
 Alpha Rho chapter - 19xx, Lehigh University
 Alpha Sigma chapter - 19xx, Hamilton College
 Alpha Tau chapter - 19xx, Swarthmore College

Beta Division 
 Beta Alpha chapter - 19xx, Lawrence College
 Beta Beta chapter - 19xx, Coe College
 Beta Gamma chapter - 19xx, University of Arkansas
 Beta Delta chapter - 19xx, University of Tennessee
 eta Epsilon chapter - 19xx, University of Tennessee

Gamma Division 
 Gamma Alpha chapter - 19xx, University of California
 Gamma Gamma chapter - 19xx, University of Utah

See also
National Pacemaker Awards

References

Six Pitt-Bradford Students To Be Inducted Into Society Of Collegiate Journalists. January 12 , 2005
Elizabethtown College - Communications Organizations
Southern Illinois University Carbondale, College of Mass Communication and Media Arts - Student Groups

External links
 Official website

Honor societies
American journalism organizations
Student newspapers published in the United States
Journalism-related professional associations
Organizations established in 1975